John M. Rogers is a former Democratic member of the Ohio House of Representatives, representing the 60th District which includes the Lake County communities of Eastlake, Fairport Harbor, Grand River, Lakeline, Mentor-on-the-Lake, Painesville, Timberlake, Wickliffe, Willoughby, Willowick, as well as parts of both Mentor and Painesville Township. He was first elected in 2012.

Prior to his election, Rogers was mayor of Mentor-on-the-Lake for 18 years and a Mentor-on-the-Lake city councilman for five years. He has also served as Lake County deputy treasurer and Lake County assistant prosecutor. He was chosen for the 60th District ticket by the party central committee after Lake County Commissioner Dan Troy withdrew. In the election Rogers defeated Republican Lori DiNallo with 55.47% of the vote. He would go on to be re-elected in 2014, 2016, and 2018.

References

County officials in Ohio
Living people
Democratic Party members of the Ohio House of Representatives
Year of birth missing (living people)
21st-century American politicians
Mayors of places in Ohio
Ohio city council members
Cuyahoga Community College alumni
Hiram College alumni
John Carroll University alumni
Cleveland–Marshall College of Law alumni
University of Alabama School of Law alumni